Muhammad Anwar may refer to:
 Muhammad Anwar (politician), Pakistani politician
 Muhammad Anwar (sociologist) (1945–2020), Pakistani sociologist
 Muhammad Anwar (wrestler) (born 1959), Pakistani wrestler

See also
 Muhammad Anwar Rahman (born 1996), Malaysian cricketer